E-102 can refer to:
E-102 Gamma, a character in the Sonic the Hedgehog video game series.
E102, the E number for tartrazine.